The 1856 United States presidential election in Tennessee took place on November 4, 1856, as part of the 1856 United States presidential election. Voters chose twelve representatives, or electors to the Electoral College, who voted for president and vice president.

Tennessee voted for the Democratic candidate, James Buchanan, over American Party candidate Millard Fillmore. Buchanan won Tennessee by a margin of 4.36 percentage points, although Tennessee was Fillmore’s third-strongest state after Maryland and Louisiana.

Republican Party candidate John C. Frémont was not on the ballot in the state.

This was the only instance between 1832 and 1872 when a Democrat won Tennessee. This is the most recent election in which Scott County, Hancock County, and Washington County voted for a Democratic presidential nominee.

Results

References

Tennessee
1856
1856 Tennessee elections